Brozany nad Ohří is a market town in Litoměřice District in the Ústí nad Labem Region of the Czech Republic. It has about 1,300 inhabitants.

Administrative parts
The village of Hostěnice is an administrative part of Brozany nad Ohří.

References

Populated places in Litoměřice District
Market towns in the Czech Republic